Barclay Hope (born February 25, 1958) is a Canadian actor. He is perhaps best known for his roles as Clifford and Claudius Blossom on Riverdale, Mike Hayden on Street Legal, Peter Axon on PSI Factor, Col. Lionel Pendergast on Stargate SG-1, and Gen. Mansfield on Eureka.

Life and career
Hope was born in 1958 in Montreal, Quebec, Canada. He is the younger brother of the actor William Hope. Hope appeared in the TV series Psi Factor: Chronicles of the Paranormal (1996–2000) as Peter Axon. His screen credits include The Wager (1998) directed by Aaron Woodley which also starred Peter Blais and Valerie Boyle and Paycheck (2003) directed by John Woo. He also had recurring roles as Colonel Lionel Pendergast on Stargate SG-1 and as General Mansfield on Eureka.

Hope is married to fellow actress Lindsay Collins and they have 3 children - Sally, Maggie and Charlie.

Filmography

Film

Television

Video games

References

External links

1958 births
Living people
Male actors from Montreal
Anglophone Quebec people
Canadian male film actors
Canadian male television actors
Canadian male voice actors
20th-century Canadian male actors
21st-century Canadian male actors